Reaume Brothers Racing is an American professional stock car racing team that currently competes full-time in the NASCAR Craftsman Truck Series. The team is owned by Josh Reaume, and it currently fields the No. 33 Ford F-150 for Mason Massey and the No. 34 for multiple drivers.

Driver Development Program 
In July 2021, Reaume Brothers Racing announced its new late model driver development program. In a press release, it was announced former kart racer Stephen Mallozzi and RBR employee Johnathan Cuevas would be the program’s two inaugural drivers. Reaume expressed a desire to help young drivers the way he had been helped throughout his career, and felt creating a development program was the best way to go about doing so.

Xfinity Series
In 2020, RBR took over operations of the RSS Racing No. 93 entry in late June and retained those duties for the rest of the season. The partnership continued in 2021 with the RSS No. 23 before Our Motorsports purchased the car's owner points in March.

After Our acquired the No. 23, RBR formed a partnership to field MBM Motorsports' No. 13.

Car No. 33 history
In 2021, Loris Hezemans attempted this car at the Pennzoil 150, but failed to qualify. 

In 2022, Reaume Brothers would run part-time with Natalie Decker driving the No. 33 on a part-time schedule with NERD Focus and Plant Life as sponsors, which will begin in the Beef. It’s What’s For Dinner. 300. Reaume later announced that Will Rodgers would be piloting the 33 in the Production Alliance Group 300 and at Circuit of the Americas. Loris Hezemans attempted to qualify at Phoenix.

Car No. 33 results

Camping World Truck Series

Truck No. 00 history
In 2020, Reaume debuted the No. 00. Angela Ruch was announced to be the full-time driver. However, after eight races, Ruch was released to a lack of sponsorship. For the rest of the season, Josh Reaume, Dawson Cram, Ryan Huff, Bobby Kennedy, J. J. Yeley, Kyle Donahue, Josh Bilicki and Jason White filled the schedule. The team's best finish was a 17th at Michigan International Speedway with team owner Reaume behind the wheel. Following the 2020 season the 00 team was shut down.

Truck No. 00 results

Truck No. 32 history
Daniel Sasnett drove the No. 32 Toyota Tundra at World Wide Technology Raceway at Gateway in 2019, where he started 30th and finished 26th. The team entered for select events throughout the season. On July 26, 2019, Reaume Brothers Racing announced that Devin Dodson would make his NGOTS debut in the No. 34 Chevrolet at Eldora. The number was later changed to 32. For the rest of the season in the 32, Mason Massey, Daniel Sasnett, Bryant Barnhill, Devin Dodson and Gregory Rayl made one start apiece.  Following the 2019 season the 32 team shut down.

Truck No. 32 results

Truck No. 33 history

On February 15, 2018, it was announced that a brand new team would open and field the No. 33 Chevrolet Silverado full-time for Josh Reaume. The team failed to qualify for the season opener at Daytona. They then qualified for the next 7 races with a best finish of 23rd at Texas before another DNQ at Iowa. He for the next three races with a best finish of 22nd at Chicago. The team completed the rest of the season with Jason White, Robby Lyons, and Chad Finley with a best finish of 14th at Talladega with Lyons.

The team returned for the 2019 season with Josh Reaume at Daytona where he would pick up a 6th-place finish, he would return at Atlanta and finish 30th. When the entry list for the Las Vegas race was released it was revealed YouTube personality MrBeast would sponsor Reaume although the truck was not run and ended up finishing 23rd. At Martinsville the next week Daniel Sasnett was tabbed to drive while also making his debut, he would end up finishing 30th. Reaume had originally planned to run the entire season, but could not find sponsorship and put other drivers in the No. 33 for some races. Experienced dirt racer Mike Marlar drove the No. 33 at that year's Eldora Speedway race. He finished fourth, marking the best finish for an RBR entry up to that point.

In 2020, Jason White, Gray Gaulding, Akinori Ogata, Bryant Barnhill, Josh Reaume and others drove the No. 33 car. White kicked off the season with a 10th in the NextEra Energy 250, but the team did not score another top 10 all season long. The team's only other top 20 was an 18th at the Daytona Road Course, with Bryan Collyer behind the wheel, who was making his debut.

White returned in 2021 for the first two events of the season in the NextEra Energy 250 and the BrakeBest Select 159. NASCAR Xfinity Series driver Myatt Snider ran in the inaugural Pinty's Dirt Truck Race, finishing 22nd, and Cameron Lawrence made his series debut in the Texas Grand Prix. He was running in the top 10 and then suffered mechanical problems, dropping him to last, 8 laps down. The No. 33’s best finish in 2021 ended up being an 18th-place finish with debutant Devon Rouse in the Corn Belt 150.

In 2022, Jason White ran the 33 truck in the NextEra Energy 250, finishing 20th after a late crash with Kris Wright. Loris Hezemans will make his truck debut at Las Vegas. Chase Janes would drive at Martinsville. Mike Marlar would make a cameo appearance at Bristol Dirt. Mason Maggio would debut at Gateway. Jade Buford would race at Sonoma. Brayton Laster in for Knoxville. Japanese Kenko Miura would appear in Mid-Ohio.

Truck No. 34 history
The team fielded this truck for Jeffrey Abbey at Eldora Speedway. Abbey qualified for the race and finished 12th. The team fielded the No. 34 truck once again at Pocono with J. J. Yeley driving where he finished 31st. The truck returned to Michigan with B. J. McLeod where he finished 29th. The truck returned once again with debuting driver Jesse Iwuji in Canada in which he finished 25th.

The truck returned for most of the 2019 season.

In 2020, the truck was reduced to running only two races, one with Josh Bilicki and the other with Bryant Barnhill.

In 2021, the truck returned for the full season with Lawless Alan making his debut in the BrakeBest Select 159. Alan also would run the Toyota Tundra 225, Rackley Roofing 200, CRC Brakleen 150, Bully Hill Vineyards 150, UNOH 200 and the Chevrolet Silverado 250. Jake Griffin ran the dirt races.  Chris Hacker made his Truck Series debut with the team at World Wide Technology Raceway in the Toyota 200. Dylan Lupton would drive for the rest of the season.

The No. 34 did not return in 2022.

Truck No. 34 results

Truck No. 43 history
On February 10, 2022, it was announced that the team would make a collaboration with GMS Racing fielding the No. 43 Chevrolet Silverado for Thad Moffitt, running a paint scheme that pays tribute to Richard Petty's 1992 retirement season. Josh Williams Motorsports ARCA driver Brad Perez will make his debut at COTA. African-American Blake Lothian made his debut at Martinsville. Devon Rouse would return in Knoxville. Nicky Leitz in for Nashville. Stephen Mallozzi would make his debut at Mid-Ohio.

References

External links
 

NASCAR teams
2018 establishments in North Carolina